Marcos Cipac de Aquino (?–1572),  informally known as Marcos the Indian, was a Roman Catholic Nahuatl artist in sixteenth-century Mexico, who may have been the painter of the image of the Virgin of Guadalupe. Art historian Jeanette Favrot Peterson has ventured "Marcos Cipac (de Aquino) was the artist of the Mexican Guadalupe, capable of executing a large Marian painting on cloth within a professional milieu that was abundantly stock to stimulate his innate artistry.". The basis of her conjecture is evidence in the Anales de Juan Bautista, a manuscript housed in the Biblioteca Boturini of the Basilica of Guadalupe and translated and published in 2001. Mexican scholars of the nineteenth century posited the painting's artist as Marcos Cipac de Aquino, including Joaquín García Icazbalceta in his "Carta acerca del Origen de la Imagen de Nuestra Sra. de Guadalupe" (1883) and Francisco del Paso y Troncoso's "Noticia del indio Marcos y de otros pintores del siglo XVI" (1891).  There is some skepticism about the identification of the painting with Cipac Aquino. He is identified by a 1556 sermon, which  referred to him only as Marcos. This sermon came to light only in 1888. Marcos de Aquino is credited with the painting also by Leoncio Garza-Valdés on the basis of a scientific investigation.

In the 1576 book Historia verdadera de la conquista de la Nueva España  by Bernal Díaz del Castillo, a contemporary of Marcos Cipac de Aquino, the author writes on page 233 that "Even at this day there are living in Mexico three Indian artists, named Marcos de Aguino, Juan de la Cruz, and El Crespello, who have severally reached to such great proficiency in the art of painting and sculpture, that they may be compared to an Apelles, or our contemporaries Michael Angelo and Berruguete."

Further reading
 Peterson, Jeanette Favrot. Visualizing Guadalupe: From Black Madonna to Queen of the Americas. Austin: University of Texas Press 2014.
 Poole, Stafford. Our Lady of Guadalupe: The Origins and Sources of a Mexican National Symbol, 1531-1797. Tucson: University of Arizona Press 1995
 Reyes García, Luis Reyes. Anales de Juan Bautista. Mexico City: Biblioteca Lorenzo Boturini, Insigne y Nacional Basílica de Guadalupe 2001.

References

 

Mexican painters
Year of birth missing
1572 deaths
Our Lady of Guadalupe
Aztec people